The Sailor from Gibraltar is a 1967 British romantic drama film directed by Tony Richardson and starring Jeanne Moreau, Ian Bannen, Vanessa Redgrave, Hugh Griffith and Orson Welles. The screenplay concerns a mysterious woman who wanders the globe, searching for a sailor she knew many years earlier, unwittingly attracting others to her and her strange quest.

Plot
Alan, after quarreling with his girlfriend Sheila, becomes to be intrigued by Anna, a mysterious widow who's searching a sailor known many years before, based on the novel Le marin du Gibraltar by Marguerite Duras.

Cast
Jeanne Moreau - Anna 
Ian Bannen - Alan 
Vanessa Redgrave - Sheila 
Orson Welles - Louis de Mozambique 
Hugh Griffith - Llewellyn 
Zia Mohyeddin - Noori 
Umberto Orsini - Postcard Vendor

Critical reception
Time Out commended Raoul Coutard's camerawork, but dismissed the film as "Highfalutin nonsense"; whereas Derek Winnert found it "well-intentioned, weird, arty stuff in the style of the time. Director Tony Richardson turns it into a smart, interesting film that’s always intriguing even if it is not entirely a success."

References

External links
 

1967 films
1967 drama films
British drama films
Films based on French novels
Films based on works by Marguerite Duras
Films directed by Tony Richardson
1960s English-language films
1960s British films